Jiazi is a town in Qiongshan District of Haikou, Hainan, People's Republic of China, located more than  southeast of downtown Haikou.

Overview
, Jiazi is responsible for the administration of 14 villages.

History
The town received its name during the ninth year of the reign of the Qing Qianlong Emperor (1744), when a market began in the first year of the 60-year cycle, which is also called jiazi.

References

See also
List of township-level divisions of Hainan

Township-level divisions in Haikou